is an interchange railway station in the city of Semboku, Akita Prefecture, Japan, operated by East Japan Railway Company (JR East).

Lines
Kakunodate Station is served by the JR East Tazawako Line and the Akita Shinkansen, and is located 58.8 km from the terminus of both lines at Morioka Station. It is also the southern terminus for the third sector Akita Nairiku Jūkan Railway Akita Nairiku Line and is located 92.4 kilometers from the northern terminus at

Station layout
The station consists of a single side platform and an island platform serving the JR portion of the station, and a single side platform for the Akita Nairuke Railway. The station building, designed to resemble a samurai residence, was selected to be one of the "Hundred Stations of Tohoku". The station has a Midori no Madoguchi staffed ticket office.

Platforms (JR)

Platforms (Akita Nairiku)

History
Kakunodate Station opened on July 30, 1921 as a station on the Obonai Railway, which was nationalized into the Japanese Government Railways (JGR) the following year. The JGR became Japan National Railways (JNR) after World War II. The Kakunodate Line (which later became the Akita Nairiku Railway) began operation from November 1, 1971.. The station was absorbed into the JR East network upon the privatization of the JNR on April 1, 1987. Services on the Akita Shinkansen began on March 22, 1997.

Passenger statistics
In fiscal 2018, the station was used by an average of 545 passengers daily (boarding passengers only).

Surrounding area
 former Samurai residences (buke yashiki)
former Kakunodate town hall
 Kakunodate Post Office

See also
List of railway stations in Japan

References

External links

 JR East Station information 
 Akita Nairiku Railway Station information 

Railway stations in Japan opened in 1921
Railway stations in Akita Prefecture
Akita Shinkansen
Tazawako Line
Semboku, Akita